"One" is the first single by Swedish house music supergroup Swedish House Mafia. A vocal version titled "One (Your Name)", featuring American musician Pharrell Williams, was released in July 2010. The song also appears on the group's mix album Until One, and the studio album Until Now.

The song debuted on BBC Radio 1 with Zane Lowe and was chosen as the hottest record in April 2010. "One" peaked at number two in Belgium (Flanders) and on the UK Dance Chart. It reached number one in the Netherlands, number seven in Ireland and in the United Kingdom on the UK Singles Chart. It also charted in Sweden, Switzerland, Denmark, Austria and Germany. A video directed by the Swedish directors Henrik Hanson and Christian Larson supported the release.

In 2019, Swedish composer Jacob Mühlrad contributed to a symphonic version of "One", which Swedish House Mafia played on tour that year. The version was officially released on 1 January 2022, under the title "One Symphony".

Writing and production

"One" was written and produced by Axwell, Steve Angello and Sebastian Ingrosso. The lyrics in "One (Your Name)" are written by Pharrell Williams. According to Angello the vocals were recorded in Australia over a year prior to release, and were initially intended for another song. He said, "We took that and tried it on One and it worked. Well, it worked after Axwell Melodyne'd the crap out of it! [...] it's kind of old skool, chopping up one vocal and turning it into a whole dance track.".

According to an interview in Future Music magazine (issue 229), the track was composed in Logic using various plug-ins. Pharrell's vocals were heavily processed in Melodyne and the final track was mixed and mastered at Metropolis Studios London on an SSL console.

The music video features a Teenage Engineering OP-1.

Critical reception
Nick Levine of Digital Spy gave the song four out of five stars and wrote: "'One (Your Name)' is a booming Eurodance club banger boasting an ear-snaggingly simple synth line, trancey whooshes aplenty and cred-boosting vocals from Neptunes star Pharrell Williams [...] it's neither original nor refined, but boy does it hit the spot."

Track listing

Digital download
"One" – 5:50

Promo CD single
"One" (Radio Edit) – 2:47
"One" – 5:55

UK CD single
"One (Your Name)" (Radio Edit)  – 2:41
"One" (Radio Edit) – 2:48

UK digital download / CD maxi single
"One (Your Name)" (Radio Edit)  – 2:43
"One" (Radio Edit) – 2:49
"One (Your Name)" (Vocal Mix)  – 5:51
"One" (Original Mix) – 5:51
"One" (Congorock Remix) – 6:15
"One (Your Name)" (Caspa Vocal Remix)  – 4:11
"One" (Caspa Dub Remix) – 4:11
"One" (Netsky Remix) – 5:40

Digital download
"One Symphony" – 4:23

Charts and certifications

Weekly charts

Year-end charts

Certifications

Release history

"One"

"One (Your Name)"

"One Symphony"

See also
List of Dutch Top 40 number-one singles of 2010

References

2010 debut singles
2010 singles
Swedish House Mafia songs
Songs written by Pharrell Williams
Dutch Top 40 number-one singles
Eurodance songs
Songs written by Sebastian Ingrosso
Songs written by Axwell
Songs written by Steve Angello
2010 songs
Virgin Records singles